Robert Lively, sometimes credited as Bob Lively, (died 4 March 1943) was an American screenwriter and songwriter most active in the mid-1930s to early 1940s.

Selected filmography 
 The Hard-Boiled Canary, 1941 (story and screenplay)
 Isle of Destiny, 1940 (screenplay)
 The Great Victor Herbert, 1939 (screenplay / story)
 Personal Secretary, 1938 (story "The Comet")
 Danger on the Air, 1938 (screenplay)
 Rhythm Racketeer, 1937 (story)
 The Girl Said No, 1937
 Tough to Handle, 1937 (adaptation)
 The Black Coin, 1936 (adaptation and screenplay)
 Custer's Last Stand, 1936 (story dialogue)
 The Marriage Bargain, 1935
 Inside Information, 1934 (screenplay)
 Enlighten Thy Daughter, 1934 (additional dialogue)

External links

Year of birth missing
1943 deaths
American male screenwriters
American male songwriters
20th-century American male writers
20th-century American screenwriters